HD 115310, also known by its Bayer designation r Centauri, is a star in the southern constellation Centaurus. It is an orange-hued star that is visible to the naked eye with an apparent visual magnitude that ranges around +5.12. Based upon parallax measurements, it is located approximately 257 light years away. It is drifting further from the Sun with a radial velocity of +12.9 km/s.

This object is an aging K-type giant star with a stellar classification of K1III. It is classified as a red clump giant, suggesting it is on the horizontal branch undergoing core helium fusion. The star has 2.7 times the mass of the Sun and has expanded to 11 times the Sun's radius. It is radiating 67 times the luminosity of the Sun from its swollen photosphere at an effective temperature of 5,060 K.

References

K-type giants
Horizontal-branch stars

Centaurus (constellation)
Centauri, r
Durchmusterung objects
115310
5006
064803